İsmail Saymaz (born 11 July 1980, in Rize) is a Turkish investigative journalist for the newspaper Radikal (since May 2002). He has published articles and books on the Turkish deep state and Ergenekon, including a 2011 book on links between the 2007 Zirve Publishing House massacre and the 2006 killing of Andrea Santoro, and another 2011 book on former police chief Hanefi Avcı. He has won a number of awards for his work.

Saymaz has been infamous for rapidly changing his social and political views; an ultranationalist during his youth, a devout leftist criticizing Kemalism during college, an Ergenekon case journal  and  transparent state advocate while working at Radikal newspaper, an Ergenekon case denier after 2016 Turkish coup d'état attempt, a pro-state Kemalist and an anti-immigration activist. Despite his initial works and support on Ergenekon cases, Saymaz became a journalists charged in relation to reporting on the Ergenekon trials for "violating the secrecy of an investigation". In late 2010 he was involved in 12 legal cases carrying a total prison term of 97 years, beginning with five stories printed in early 2010, each with a potential sentence of nine years. beginning with five stories printed in early 2010, each with a potential sentence of nine years.

Saymaz has supported the imprisonment of journalists held under the allegation of the Gülen community and guided the re-imprisonment of publicist whose forfeits are lifted by the Turkish courts.  Saymaz has also drafted the seizure of journalist that fled Turkey.

Saymaz criticized the Turkish immigration measures by stating that the borders of the country turned to a carnival zone due to Syria policy and some immigrants are suicide bombers entered their country in this way.  After his accusations against his colleagues on being pro-western and never feeling belonging to their people, he was criticized by the media on becoming a part of the far-right organization.

Saymaz also took attention when he was starring in an investigation documentary called Tosuncuk released on Exxen.

Books
 Postmodern Cihat ("Postmodern Jihad"), Kalkedon Yayıncılık, 2010.
 Nefret - Malatya: Bir Milli Mutabakat Cinayeti ("Hate - Malatya: A Murder of National Consensus"), Kalkedon Yayıncılık, 2011.
 Hanefi Yoldaş: Gizli Örgüt Nasıl Çökertilir?, Kalkedon Yayıncılık, 2011.
 Oğlumu Öldürdünüz Arz Ederim - 12 Eylül'ün Beş Öyküsü: İnciraltı Katliamı, Cemil Kırbayır, Cengiz Aksakal, Nurettin Yedigöl, Maraş'ta Dört Yürek, Postacı Yayınevi, 2012
 Sıfır Tolerans: Polisin Eline Düşünce, İletişim Yayınevi, 2012.
 Sözde Terörist (İletişim Yayınları, 2013)
 Esas Duruşta Cinayet (İletişim Yayınları, 2014)
 Ali İsmail-Emri Kim Verdi? (İletişim Yayınları, 2015)
 Fıtrat - İş Kazası Değil, Cinayet (İletişim Yayınları, 2016)
 Çay Güzeli (İletişim Yayınları, 2017)
 Türkiye'de IŞİD (İletişim Yayınları, 2017)
 Kimsesizler Cumhuriyeti, (İletişim Yayınları, 2018)

Awards 
 Metin Göktepe Gazetecilik Ödülü (Metin Göktepe Journalism Award) (2010)
 Freedom of Press Award of the Turkish Journalists' Association (2010)
 Ayşe Zarakolu Freedom of Thought prize (2011) 
 Turkish Publishers Association's Freedom of Thought and Expression Prize (2012)

References

External links
 Blog at Radikal

1980 births
Living people
Turkish journalists
Radikal (newspaper) people
People from Rize